Chan Che-yuan (born 23 October 1989) is a Taiwanese footballer who currently plays for the National Sports Training Center football team in Taiwan as an attacking midfielder.

International career
Chan played his first international game with the senior national team on 16 January 2010 against the Philippines (0–0), where he was part of the starting squad and played the entire match.

References

External links
 

1989 births
Living people
Footballers from Kaohsiung
Chinese Taipei international footballers
Association football midfielders
Taiwanese footballers